{{Drugbox
| IUPAC_name = N-[(5-chloro-2-thienyl)methyl]-''N',N-dimethyl-N-(2-pyridyl)ethane-1,2-diamine
| image = Chlorothen.png

| tradename = Thenclor
| pregnancy_category =  
| legal_status =  
| routes_of_administration = Oral

| bioavailability =  
| protein_bound =  
| metabolism =  
| elimination_half-life =  
| excretion =  

| CAS_number = 148-65-2
| ATC_prefix = none
| ATC_suffix = 
| PubChem = 8993
| ChEMBL = 2110628
| ChemSpiderID = 8645
| UNII = Y6068K376I

| C=14 | H=18 | Cl=1 | N=3 | S=1 
| smiles = Clc1sc(cc1)CN(c2ncccc2)CCN(C)C
| StdInChI = InChI=1S/C14H18ClN3S/c1-17(2)9-10-18(14-5-3-4-8-16-14)11-12-6-7-13(15)19-12/h3-8H,9-11H2,1-2H3
| StdInChIKey = XAEXSWVTEJHRMH-UHFFFAOYSA-N
}}Chlorothen (trade name Thenclor''') is an antihistamine and anticholinergic.

References 

Aminopyridines
Thiophenes
Chloroarenes
H1 receptor antagonists